QbA is a German wine classification.

QBA or Qba may also refer to:
 Quebecair (IATA code), a former airline
 Robert "Qba" Kubajek, drummer in the Polish rock group Closterkeller

See also
 WQBA, a radio station in Miami, Florida, US